Caliente Flight Strip Airport was an airport near U.S. Route 93 in Nevada.

References

Defunct airports in Nevada